H. Edward O'Daniel (born March 12, 1938) was an American politician in the state of Kentucky. He served in the Kentucky Senate as a Democrat from 1978 to 1990.

References

1938 births
Living people
Democratic Party Kentucky state senators
Politicians from Bowling Green, Kentucky